Polyipnus paxtoni is a species of ray-finned fish in the genus Polyipnus found in the Western Central Pacific between depths of 0 and 300 meters.

References 

Sternoptychidae
Fauna of Queensland
Fish described in 1989